opened as  in Abashiri, Hokkaidō, Japan in 1936, making it one of the oldest museums on the island. In 1948, the museum was transferred to the city. A new building was added in 1961 to celebrate 25 years from the original opening. Both the main building and the new building were designed by architect Tanoue Yoshiya, a pupil of Frank Lloyd Wright, and mark the transitions in his style. They are national Registered Tangible Cultural Properties. 

The exhibits document the natural and cultural history of the area, from the Japanese Paleolithic, through the Jōmon and Zoku-Jōmon periods, up until daily life during the Shōwa era, and include materials relating to the Satsumon culture, Okhotsk culture, and Ainu. The Moyoro Shell Mound Museum operates as an annex.

See also
 List of Historic Sites of Japan (Hokkaidō)
 Katsuragaoka Chashi
 Hokkaido Museum
 Abashiri Prison Museum

References

External links

 Abashiri City Folk Museum

Abashiri, Hokkaido
Museums in Hokkaido
City museums in Japan
Folk museums in Japan
Museums established in 1936
1936 establishments in Japan